Haplotrema is a genus of carnivorous land snails in the family Haplotrematidae. They are widely distributed in North America.

Species 
Species include:
 Haplotrema alameda Pilsbry, 1930 – Alameda lancetooth
 Haplotrema caelatum (Mazyck, 1886) – slotted lancetooth
 Haplotrema catalinense (Hemphill, 1890) – Catalina lancetooth
 Haplotrema concavum (Say, 1821) – gray-footed lancetooth
 Haplotrema continentis H.B.Baker, 1930 – grizzly lancetooth
 Haplotrema costatum A.G.Smith, 1957 – costate lancetooth
 Haplotrema duranti (Newcomb, 1864) – ribbed lancetooth
 Haplotrema keepi (Hemphill, 1890) – glassy lancetooth
 Haplotrema kendeighi Webb, 1951 – blue-footed lancetooth
 Haplotrema minimum (Ancey, 1888) – California lancetooth
 Haplotrema mokelumnense Roth, 1990 – Mokelumne lancetooth
 Haplotrema sportella (Gould, 1846) – beaded lancetooth
 Haplotrema transfuga (Hemphill, 1892) – striate lancetooth
 Haplotrema vancouverense (I. Lea, 1839) – robust lancetooth
 Haplotrema voyanum (Newcomb, 1864) – hooded lancetooth

References

External links
 Haplotrema concavum. University of Florida IFAS.

Haplotrematidae